Heinrich (Heinz) Klöpper (9 January 1918 – 29 November 1943) was a former Luftwaffe fighter ace and recipient of the Knight's Cross of the Iron Cross during World War II. Heinrich Klöpper was credited with 94 victories.

Career
In 1940 Heinrich (Heinz) Klöpper served with Jagdgeschwader 77 (JG 77), during the Battle of France and the Battle of Britain he recorded his first two victories. On the first day of Operation Barbarossa, the German invasion of the Soviet Union on 22 June 1941, he claimed his first victory on the Eastern Front, when he shot down a Russian SB-3 bomber. On 27 October 1941 he claimed a double Soviet victory, shooting down two LaGG-3 fighters. Another double on 5 July 1942, an Il-2 and an I-16 Rata; and five victories on 7 July 1942. Another five victories on 4 August 1942; a MiG-3, a Pe-2 and three Il-2 ground-attack aircraft. On the Western Front his 91st victim was a B-17 bomber on 5 November 1943. His 92nd, was a P-38 Lightning fighter on 13 November 1943. His 93rd victim was a B-24 Liberator bomber, "Sack-Time Sally", on 26 November 1943 and his 94th and final victory was a P-38 at Hasselt, on 29 November 1943.

Heinrich (Heinz) Klöpper was killed on 29 November 1943 on the Western Front, when his plane was shot down in a dogfight with two US Army Air Force P-38 Lightnings. He crashed near "de Oldenhof" castle in the vicinity of Vollenhove, in the Netherlands. He was Staffelkapitän of 7./Jagdgeschwader 1.

During his career, he shot down a total of 94 enemy planes in approximately 500 combat missions (18 victories were on the Western Front), of which eight were four engined bombers and seven Il-2 Sturmoviks.

Awards
 Iron Cross (1939)
 2nd Class
 1st Class
 Wound Badge in Black (25 June 1943)
 Front Flying Clasp of the Luftwaffe in Gold with Pennant
 Ehrenpokal der Luftwaffe on 20 October 1941 as Feldwebel in a Jagdgeschwader
 German Cross in Gold on 21 August 1942 as Oberfeldwebel in the VI./Jagdgeschwader 51
 Knight's Cross of the Iron Cross on 4 September 1942 as Oberfeldwebel and pilot in the 11./Jagdgeschwader 51 "Mölders"

References

Citations

Bibliography

 
 
 
 
 

1918 births
1943 deaths
Luftwaffe pilots
Luftwaffe personnel killed in World War II
Recipients of the Knight's Cross of the Iron Cross
Aviators killed by being shot down
Military personnel from Lower Saxony
German World War II flying aces
People from Peine (district)